Oh Ji-Min (born May 27, 1988), known professionally as J-Min(), is a South Korean singer, songwriter and musical actress. She began her career in Japan before eventually debuting in South Korea.

Career

2007–2009: Debut
J-Min made her debut in Japan with her first extended play, Korogaru Ringo, on September 12, 2007.

On January 16, 2008, J-Min's second Japanese extended play, Dream On... was released. Following the release of her second extended play, her cover album title "The Singer" was released on November 19. The album included cover songs from several Japanese songs previously released.

J-Min released a digital single titled Change/One on May 27, 2009. It was used as the opening and ending theme for the TV anime adaptation of Hanasakeru Seishounen. The single was her last released under Avex Trax before her contract expired in 2012.

2012–2013: Original soundtracks, If You Want, musical roles and Heart Theatre
J-Min released several original soundtracks for dramas in 2012. She released the first soundtrack, titled "Hello, Love", for KBS2's drama Wild Romance on January 30. The second soundtrack, titled "", was released for MBC's drama God of War on April 13. The third soundtrack, titled  "Can't Say It", was released for MBC's drama The King 2 Hearts on April 27. The fourth soundtrack, titled "Story", was released for KBS2's drama Sent from Heaven on July 2. The fifth soundtrack, titled "Stand Up", was released for SBS's drama To the Beautiful You on August 15. Apart from composing the song, Groovie. K also provided the lyrics for the song. The music video for "Stand Up" was released on September 19, 2012. Aside from featuring early scenes from the drama series, it also included a guest appearance by TRAX's Jungmo. The band version of the music video was unveiled on October 4, 2012. J-Min and Jungmo performed a special stage on Inkigayo on August 26, 2012. Her last soundtrack in 2012, titled "Beautiful Days", was released for KBS2's drama School 2013 on December 11.

In June 2012, J-Min started her musical career with the role of Gloria in the musical 'Jack the Ripper'. The musical ran from June 1 to August 18, 2012, at Chungmu Art Hall in Seoul.

J-Min signed a contract with Nayutawave Records (now also known EMI Records) in 2012. She later released the digital single If You Want on November 21, 2012. A few months later, her new digital single title Heart Theater was released on March 13, 2013.

In February 2013, J-Min starred in the musical 'The Three Musketeers' as Constance. It ran from February 20 to April 21, 2013, at Chungmu Art Hall in Seoul.

2014–present: Cross The Border, domestic debut, musical
J-Min released her first Japanese album, Cross The Border on January 22, 2014. She also recorded the soundtrack Hero for MBC's drama Miss Korea. On June 19, J-Min made her official debut stage, performing Hoo on the music program M Countdown and various weekly music programs. Her pre-released single Hoo was digitally released on June 24.Hoo is an acoustic ballad and a re-arrangement of Hero, the soundtrack for the drama Miss Korea. Following pre-released single, her extended play title Shine was digitally released on July 18 and physically on July 21. The music video featured Titan and starred by SM Rookies' Ji Han Sol.

In 2015, J-Min played Vanessa in the musical In The Heights. She alternated the role with actress Oh Soyeon. The musical was produced by SM C&C, a subsidiary of S.M. Entertainment, and ran from September 4 to November 22 at 'Blue Square'. In December 2015, J-Min confirmed that she would be playing Yitzhak in the musical Hedwig: New Makeup. The musical ran from March 1, 2016, to May 29, 2016, at Hongik University Art Center.

J-Min released the digital single Way Back Home on July 8, 2016, as part of SM Entertainment's project SM Station. The song was composed by Shim Eunji and the music video starred Red Velvet's Yeri. She performed this song for the first time on SM Town Live World Tour V in Osaka.

On August 5, 2016, it was announced that she would release her digital single Ready For Your Love on August 9. The music video for Ready For Your Love, starring J-Min and NCT's Johnny, was released on August 9, along with the digital single. On October 15, J-Min was confirmed to become radio host on Arirang Radio's SoundK for "musictomusic" corner.

In February 2017, J-Min was confirmed to cast in the musical drama entitled Boys Over Flowers: The Musical. A musical version has previously been performed in Japan. She will be playing role as Tsukushi (or Geum Jan Di). The musical will run from February 24, 2017, to May 7, 2017, in Seoul. On March 17, she announced the release of a digital single, Alive on March 20.

Discography

Studio albums

Extended plays

Singles

Soundtrack appearances

Other appearances

Videography

Music videos

Concerts

Headlining 
2008~2009 JAPAN Live Concert [J-Min Acoustic Live: The Singer]

Concert participation 
SMTown Live '10 World Tour (2010–11)
SMTown Live World Tour III (2012–13)
SM Town Live World Tour IV (2014–15)
SM Town Live World Tour V (2016)
SM Town Live World Tour VI (2017)

Filmography

Variety shows

Theater

References

External links
 J-Min's Official Website  

1988 births
Living people
South Korean women pop singers
South Korean singer-songwriters
K-pop singers
South Korean rock singers
South Korean expatriates in Japan
SM Entertainment artists
SM Town
Universal Music Japan artists
South Korean musical theatre actresses
South Korean women singer-songwriters